Fumonisin B4 (or FB4) is a fumonisin mycotoxin produced mainly by the fungi Fusarium proliferatum, Fusarium verticillioides (formerly Fusarium moniliforme). Recently FB4 has been detected in fungi Aspergillus niger and in several Tolypocladium species.

FB4 is similar to fumonisin B2 and fumonisin B3 but it is lacking a hydroxy group located gamma- to the amino substituent while lacking two hydroxy groups compared to fumonisin B1.
Fumonisin B4 has been first published in 1991.

Isomers
Several isomers of Fumonisin B4 have been detected. A larger group is the partially hydrolysed form, denoted as PHFB4, which has been detected using HPLC-ITMS. Another significant isomer is the 3-epi-FB4, which has been identified using NMR, it has also been shown that this isomer occur 10-40% of the regular FB4 sample in nature.

Toxicity
Fumonisin B4 belongs to the class of FB analogues, which is the most significant group from toxicity perspective.
Currently Fumonisin B4's toxicity compared to Fumonisin B1 or B2 is unknown as further research is actively ongoing, however in nature its concentration is significantly lower. Fumonisin B4 inhibits sphingosine acyltransferase.

Fumonisin B4 and other fumonisins frequently contaminate maize and other crops.

References 

Mycotoxins
Enzyme inhibitors